X-Men Black is a 2018 comic book anthology series, with stories starring villains from the X-Men comics.

Publication history
The initial announcement from Marvel was only the title and cover of the first issue, featuring Magneto. This led to confusion and speculation that it would be an ongoing series starring Magneto. Marvel soon clarified that it was intended to be an anthology series. Each story had its creative team, but all covers were made by J. Scott Campbell.

Stories
The characters and their respective creative teams were as follows:
 Magneto #1 – Chris Claremont / Dalibor Talajic
 Mojo #1 – Scott Aukerman / Nick Bradshaw
 Mystique #1 – Seanan McGuire / Marco Failla
 Juggernaut #1 – Robbie Thompson / Shawn Crystal
 Emma Frost #1 – Leah Williams / Chris Bachalo

References

 

2018 comics debuts
2018 comics endings
Supervillains with their own comic book titles
X-Men titles